William Clark Jr. (October 12, 1930 – January 22, 2008) was an American diplomat who served as Assistant Secretary of State for East Asian and Pacific Affairs and U.S. Ambassador to India.

Early life and education 
Clark was born in Oakland, California. He earned a bachelor's degree from San Jose State University, a Juris Doctor from the USC Gould School of Law, and a Master's degree from the Columbia University School of International Affairs. He served in the United States Navy from 1949 to 1953.

Career 
Clark began his career at the United States Department of State as Principal Deputy Assistant Secretary of the Bureau of East Asian and Pacific Affairs. Prior to this, he served for four years as Minister and deputy chief of mission for the Embassy of the United States, Tokyo, and as deputy chief of mission and Chargé d'affaires for the U.S. Embassy in Cairo, Egypt.

After retired from the United States Foreign Service, Clark was president of the Japan Society. He also worked as Managing Director of Hills and Company, an international trade consultancy firm based in Washington, D.C.

Clark received numerous awards, including the Order of the Sacred Treasure Gold and Silver Star, conferred by the Emperor of Japan (2000), and the Department of State Distinguished Honor Award (1989).

Personal life 
Clark was married and had one son.

References

Ambassadors of the United States to India
1930 births
2008 deaths
School of International and Public Affairs, Columbia University alumni
San Jose State University alumni
USC Gould School of Law alumni
United States Foreign Service personnel
Assistant Secretaries of State for East Asian and Pacific Affairs
Recipients of the Order of the Sacred Treasure, 2nd class